The 1986 Argentina rugby union tour of Australia was a series of seven matches played by the Argentina national rugby union team in June and July 1986.

Matches

 N.S.W. Country Grant; Bailey, Vignes, Parkes, Callow; Tonkin, McTaggart; Quilter, Cartes, Wansfora; Melrose, McKenzie; Torque, Hill, Tanner. Argentina: B. Miguens (R. Madero); R. Annichini, D. Cuesta Silva, F. Turnes, P. Lanza; H. Porta (Capt.), F.Gómez; A. Schiavio, E. Ure, J. Allen; G. Milano, E. Branca; S. Dengra, J. Angelillo, D. Sanés. 

 South Australian XV: Fidock; McAuliffe, Burke, Cook, Damu; G.Ella, Doughty; Dyjksman, Cochrane, Ball; Mc Dall, Harris; Mayhew, Palmer, Abraham (Fauster). Argentina:' R.Madero (Capt.); J.Lanza, G.Patrono, D.Cuesta Silva, R.Annichini; G.Gotummo, J, Miguens; T.Petérsen, E.Ure, P.Dinisio; E.Branca, J.Uriarte; I.Valessani, D.Flash, F.Morel. 

New South Wales: Leeds; Williams, Burke, Owen, Vignes; James, Farr-Jones; Poidevin, Tuynman (Reynolds), Calcraft; Hall, Fitzsimons; Rodriguez, Palmer BuIlrrows. Argentina : R.Madero; P.Lanza, F.Turnes, D.Cuesta Silva, J.Lanza; H.Porta (capt.) (G.Gotusso), F.Gómez; A.Schiavio, E.Ure, J.Allen; G.Milano, E.Branca; E.Valessani, D.Cash, S.Dengra. 

 Queensland: Martin; Grigg, Slack, Lane, Moon; Lynagh, Slattery; Nasall, Gadner, Miller; Campbell, Frawley; McIntyre, Lawton, Lilligan. Argentina : B.Miguens; R.Annichini, D.Cuesta Silva.R.Madero (Capt.) P.Lanza; F.Turnés, J.Miguens; T.Pétersen, E.Ure, P.Dinisio; J.Uriarte, G.Milano; F.Morel, J.Angelillo, D.Sanés. 

Queensland Country: King; Caswell, Bruce, Mannix, Cooper; Randall, Hayes; Needham, Bickley, McKay Becker, McGowan; O'Mara (Karia), Gordon, Fielding Argentina : B.Miguens; J.Lanza, D.Cuesta Silva, G.Patrono, P.Lanza; R.Madero (Capt.), J.Miguens; A.Schiavio, G.Milano, J.Allen (P.Dinisio); J.Uriarte, E.Branca; E.Valessani, D.Cash, S.Dengra.

Sources

1986
1986
1986 in Australian rugby union
rugby
History of rugby union matches between Argentina and Australia